The following article presents a summary of the 2017–18 football season in Croatia, which will be the 27th season of competitive football in the country.

National teams

Croatia

Croatia U21

Croatia U19

Croatia U17

Croatia Women's

Croatia Women's U19

Croatia Women's U17

League tables

Croatian First Football League

Croatian Second Football League

Croatian clubs in Europe

Summary

Rijeka

Dinamo Zagreb

Hajduk Split

Osijek

ŽNK Osijek

Lokomotiva U19

References